Philip Williamson (born 1953) is a British historian. He studied history at Peterhouse, Cambridge, under Maurice Cowling, and is considered one of the members of the Peterhouse School. He is emeritus professor of modern British history at the University of Durham.

Works

Author
National Crisis and National Government. British Politics, the Economy and Empire 1926-1932 (Cambridge University Press, 1992).
Stanley Baldwin. Conservative Leadership and National Values (Cambridge University Press, 1999).

Editor
The Modernisation of Conservative Politics. The Diaries and Letters of William Bridgeman 1904-1935 (The Historians' Press, 1988).
(with Edward Baldwin), Baldwin Papers. A Conservative Statesman 1908-1947 (Cambridge University Press, 2004).
(with Natalie Mears, Alasdair Raffe & Stephen Taylor), National Prayers: Special Worship since the Reformation. Volume 1: Special Prayers, Fasts and Thanksgivings in the British Isles, 1533-1688 (Church of England Record Society, 2013).
(with Alasdair Raffe, Stephen Taylor & Natalie Mears), National Prayers: Special Worship since the Reformation. Volume 2: General Fasts, Thanksgivings and Special Prayers in the British Isles, 1689-1870 (Church of England Record Society, 2017).

Notes

1953 births
Living people
Alumni of Peterhouse, Cambridge
British historians
Academics of Durham University